was a private junior college in Tondabayashi Osaka Prefecture, Japan. It was established in 1974 as a junior college of PL Kyodan. A distance course was set up in 1977 and discontinued in 1988. It was abolished in 2009.

Academic department
 Childcare studies
 Primary education studies

See also 
 List of junior colleges in Japan

References

External links
  

Japanese junior colleges
Educational institutions established in 1974
Private universities and colleges in Japan
Universities and colleges in Osaka Prefecture
1974 establishments in Japan
2009 disestablishments in Japan